Kostolec is a village and municipality in Považská Bystrica District in the Trenčín Region of north-western Slovakia.

History
In historical records the village was first mentioned in 1430.

Geography
The municipality lies at an altitude of 495 metres and covers an area of 4.001 km². It has a population of about 256 people.

Genealogical resources

The records for genealogical research are available at the state archive "Statny Archiv in Bytca, Slovakia"

 Roman Catholic church records (births/marriages/deaths): 1764-1895 (parish B)
 Lutheran church records (births/marriages/deaths): 1801-1907 (parish B)

See also
 List of municipalities and towns in Slovakia

References

External links

 
https://web.archive.org/web/20090412234949/http://www.statistics.sk/mosmis/eng/run.html
Surnames of living people in Kostolec

Villages and municipalities in Považská Bystrica District